= Surface activity =

Surface activity may refer to

- Stellar magnetic field § Surface activity
- Plate tectonics, a form of planetary surface activity

== See also ==
- Surfactant, a surface active agent
